Digger Ifeanyi Okonkwo (born 30 August 1977) is a former professional footballer who last played for Senglea Athletic. Born in Nigeria, he represented the Malta national team.

Career
Digger has previously played for many different Maltese clubs such as Għajnsielem, Pietà Hotspurs, Mosta F.C. and Naxxar Lions, before ending his career at Senglea Athletic.

International career
Okonkwo has also represented the Malta national side and played his first match on 21 August 1999.

References

External links

1977 births
Living people
People with acquired Maltese citizenship
Maltese footballers
Igbo sportspeople
Għajnsielem F.C. players
Naxxar Lions F.C. players
Pietà Hotspurs F.C. players
Mosta F.C. players
Nigerian expatriates in Malta
Malta international footballers
Association football defenders
Nigerian emigrants to Malta